Ho Ching Lam (born August 23, 1992) is a Hong Kong female acrobatic gymnast. With partners Carmen Gast and Lam Ho Ching, Ho Ching Lam competed in the 2014 Acrobatic Gymnastics World Championships.

References

1999 births
Living people
Hong Kong acrobatic gymnasts
Female acrobatic gymnasts